Gariep Local Municipality is a defunct local municipality in Joe Gqabi District Municipality, Eastern Cape. The municipality was merged with Maletswai Local Municipality immediately after the August 2016 Local Municipal Elections to form the new Walter Sisulu Local Municipality.

Main places
The 2011 census divided the municipality into the following main places:

Politics 
The municipal council consisted of ten members elected by mixed-member proportional representation. Five councillors were elected by first-past-the-post voting in five wards, while the remaining five were chosen from party lists so that the total number of party representatives was proportional to the number of votes received. In the election of 18 May 2011 the African National Congress (ANC) won a majority of seven seats on the council.
The following table shows the results of the election.

References

External links
 https://web.archive.org/web/20120914054225/http://www.gariep.gov.za/

Former local municipalities of South Africa